Gianmatteo Mareggini (born 8 January 1967, in Modena) is an Italian former footballer, who played as a goalkeeper. He is currently a goalkeeping coach for Figline.

Career
Mareggini spent most of his footballing career playing in Tuscany, most notably with Fiorentina, where he mainly played as a second-choice keeper from 1985 to 2000, representing the Florence club in the Italian top flight as well as in Serie B; during his time with Fiorentina, he had loan spells with several other clubs, mainly based in Tuscany. Mareggini retired in June 2009 after four seasons with Pistoiese in the lower Italian divisions.

Honours
Fiorentina
Coppa Italia: 1995–96
Supercoppa Italiana: 1996

References

External links

1967 births
Living people
Italian footballers
ACF Fiorentina players
S.S.D. Lucchese 1905 players
Carrarese Calcio players
Palermo F.C. players
A.C.N. Siena 1904 players
Ternana Calcio players
U.S. Livorno 1915 players
U.S. Pistoiese 1921 players
Serie A players
Serie B players
Serie C players
Association football goalkeepers
Sportspeople from Modena
Footballers from Emilia-Romagna